Charles Browne may refer to:

 Charles Browne (politician) (1875–1947), American politician from New Jersey
 Charles Albert Browne Jr. (1870–1947), American sugar chemist
 Charles E. Browne (1816–1895), American pioneer and territorial legislator
 Charles Farrar Browne (1834–1867), American humor writer
 Charles P. Browne (1840–1916), New Zealand photographer

See also
 Charles Brown (disambiguation)